Piero Tordera (born 1885, date of death unknown) was an Italian wrestler. He competed in the freestyle bantamweight event at the 1924 Summer Olympics.

References

External links
 

1885 births
Year of death missing
Olympic wrestlers of Italy
Wrestlers at the 1924 Summer Olympics
Italian male sport wrestlers
Place of birth missing